Don or Donald Harris may refer to:

 Don Harris (journalist) (1936–1978), NBC News correspondent killed at Jonestown
 Don Harris (American football) (born 1954), former American football safety 
 Don Harris (wrestler), one of the Harris Brothers
 Don "Sugarcane" Harris (1938–1999), American rock and roll violinist and guitarist
 Don Harris, a character in 28 Weeks Later
 Don Harris (Australian footballer) (1905–1979), Australian rules footballer
 Donald Harris (baseball) (born 1967), baseball player
 Donald Harris (composer) (1931–2016), American composer
 Donald Harris (priest) (1904–1996), Archdeacon of Bedford
 Donald J. Harris (born 1938), Stanford University economist, father of vice president Kamala Harris